The 2018 KNSB Dutch Sprint Championships in speed skating were held in Heerenveen at the Thialf ice skating rink from 27 January to 28 January 2018. The tournament was part of the 2017–2018 speed skating season. Dai Dai N'tab and Letitia de Jong won the sprint titles. The sprint championships were held at the same time as the 2018 KNSB Dutch Allround Championships.

Schedule

Medalist

Men's sprint

Women's sprint

Classification

Men's sprint

Women's sprint

Source:

References

KNSB Dutch Sprint Championships
KNSB Dutch Sprint Championships
2018 Sprint